In mathematics, and particularly in axiomatic set theory, the diamond principle  is a combinatorial principle introduced by Ronald Jensen in  that holds in the constructible universe and that implies the continuum hypothesis. Jensen extracted the diamond principle from his proof that the axiom of constructibility implies the existence of a Suslin tree.

Definitions 

There are several equivalent forms of the diamond principle.

More generally, for a given cardinal number  and a stationary set , the statement  (sometimes written  or ) is the statement that there is a sequence  such that

 each 
 for every ,  is stationary in 

Properties and use 
 showed that the diamond principle  implies the existence of Suslin trees. He also showed that  implies the diamond-plus principle, which implies the diamond principle, which implies CH. In particular the diamond principle and the diamond-plus principle are both independent of the axioms of ZFC.

The diamond principle  does not imply the existence of a Kurepa tree, but the stronger  principle implies both the  principle and the existence of a Kurepa tree.

 used  to construct a -algebra serving as a counterexample to Naimark's problem.

Shelah showed that the diamond principle solves the Whitehead problem by implying that every Whitehead group is free.

See also 
 List of statements independent of ZFC
 Statements true in

References 

Set theory
Mathematical principles
Independence results
Constructible universe